Leandriella is a genus of flowering plants belonging to the family Acanthaceae.

It is native to Madagascar.

The genus name of Leandriella is in honour of Jacques Désiré Leandri (1903–1982), a French botanist and mycologist.
It was first described and published in Notul. Syst. (Paris) Vol.8 on page 155 in 1939.

Species, according to Kew:
Leandriella oblonga 
Leandriella valvata

References

Acanthaceae
Acanthaceae genera
Plants described in 1939
Endemic flora of Madagascar